The 1902 County Championship was the 13th officially organised running of the County Championship, and ran from 1 May to 6 September 1902. Yorkshire County Cricket Club won their sixth championship title, their third title in successive seasons. Sussex finished in second place, their best placing yet.

Table
 One point was awarded for a win, and one point was taken away for each loss. Final placings were decided by dividing the number of points earned by the number of completed matches (i.e. those that ended in a win or a loss), and multiplying by 100.

Records

References

External links

1902 in English cricket
County Championship seasons
County